
Ascot d'Oilly Castle is situated north of the village of Ascott-under-Wychwood in the north west region of Oxfordshire. It is a scheduled ancient monument.  A fragment of the castle remains and is a Grade II listed building. It was named after Roger d'Oilly who was granted it by William the Conqueror and whose brother built Oxford Castle. It is thought that the castle was built around 1129 and it was demolished soon after 1175. There are fragmentary remains of a stone tower. The remains consist of raised ground surrounded by broad ditching.

The ruins of the keep are situated on top of this mound in the central  area. It was excavated by Martyn Jope and R. I. Threlfall in 1946–1947 and then in 1959. Excavations carried out in 1946–1947 not only unearthed a number of important artefacts such as 12th-century shelly ware pottery, they also showed how earth was piled up around the outside of a square tower for fortification i.e the castle was built on ground level and then the clay mound, that survives to date, was built around it, instead of the castle being built on a raised mound from the start.

The castle is very close to the fortification of Ascott Earl Castle, built on an adjacent estate at the other end of the village. The castle is also very close to Leafield Castle with it only being 2.7 miles away. It is possible that these two fortifications are linked with the shared defence of West Oxfordshire.

See also
 Castles in Great Britain and Ireland
 List of castles in England

Notes

Bibliography
 Creighton, Oliver Hamilton. (2005) Castles and Landscapes: Power, Community and Fortification in Medieval England. London: Equinox. .

Further reading
 

Castles in Oxfordshire
Grade II listed buildings in Oxfordshire
Scheduled monuments in Oxfordshire
West Oxfordshire District